Emma of Paris (943 – 19 March 968), was a duchess consort of Normandy, married to Richard I, Duke of Normandy. She was the daughter of Count Hugh the Great of Paris and Hedwige of Saxony and sister of Hugh Capet, king of France.  

Emma was betrothed to Richard I in her childhood as a part of an alliance between Normandy and Paris against the French royal house. The marriage took place in 960. The union gave a permanent and useful status to Normandy, especially since the brother of Emma became king in 987. Emma has been pointed out as the mother of Emma of Normandy, but this is not chronologically possible. Emma died childless.

References 
 Christopher Harper-Bill, Elisabeth Van Houts: A Companion to the Anglo-Norman World

943 births
968 deaths
Robertians
Duchesses of Normandy
10th-century French women
10th-century Normans
10th-century Norman women